Hugh Rowland Wyatt, CVO (born 18 November 1933) was the Lord Lieutenant of West Sussex from 1999 to 2008. He succeeded the late Major General Sir Philip Ward. He also served as High Sheriff of West Sussex from 1995 to 1996.

Career
Wyatt was educated at Winchester College. He served in the Royal Sussex Regiment from 1952-54 before going on to the London School of Printing. He is now a retired businessman, having been a Director of McCorquodale Plc, the printers, until 1985, and farms at Cissbury, Findon.

He is heavily involved in Sussex affairs, for example as Chairman of the Chichester Cathedral Council; Patron of the Chichester Cathedral Restoration & Development Trust and Pallant House; and as Patron or President of many other Sussex Charities and Trusts. He is the President of the Royal Sussex Regimental Association.  Hugh Wyatt was High Sheriff of West Sussex 1995/96.

Wyatt was appointed Commander of the Royal Victorian Order (CVO) in the 2009 New Year Honours.

Positions and patronages 

Chairman, Advisory Committee on Justices of the Peace
Chairman, Advisory Committee on the General Commissioners of Income Tax
Chairman of Chichester Cathedral Council
Vice President, Chichester Cathedral Millennium Endowment Trust
Patron, Chichester Cathedral Restoration & Development Trust
Patron, Chichester Christian Care Association
Patron, Friends of St Nicholas Building Trust
Patron, The Lodge Hill Trust
Appeal President, NSPCC - Sussex Full Stop Appeal
Joint President, The Order of St John
Patron, Pallant House, Chichester
President, The Royal Sussex Regimental Association
Appeal Patron, Royal West Sussex NHS Trust
Joint President, SABC Clubs for Young People (Sussex)
Vice President, South East Reserve Forces & Cadets Association (RFCA)
Appeal President, Sussex Housing & Care
Vice President, Sussex Rural Community Council
Vice Patron, West Sussex Association for the Blind (4 Sight)
Vice President, West Sussex Federation of Young Farmers' Clubs
Joint President, The Sussex Historical Churches Trust

Footnotes

1933 births
Living people
Lord-Lieutenants of West Sussex
People educated at Winchester College
Commanders of the Royal Victorian Order
High Sheriffs of Sussex
National Society for the Prevention of Cruelty to Children people
People from Findon, West Sussex